Amdo County is a county within Nagqu of the Tibet Autonomous Region of China. The county covers an area of 43,410.85 square kilometres and is dominated by mainly by Tibetan grassland. In 2000 it had a population of 32,843 .

Its capital is Amdo Town, north of Lhasa. It contains the Amdo railway station on the new railway from Golmud to Lhasa. Cona Lake lies to the southwest of the town of Amdo.

Administrative divisions

 Zharen Town
 Yanshiping Town
 Qangma Town
 Pana Town
 Cuoma Township
 Dardü Township
 Sibnak Chenchungo Township
 Gangnyi Township
 Marchu Township
 Sewu Township
 Marrong Township
 Töma Township
 Bangmer Township

Although being administered by Amdo County, Yanshiping, Gangnyi, Marchu, Sewu, Marrong and Töma are partially or entirely located within the borders of Qinghai province.

Climate

Transportation 
Anduo railway station offers a train operated once every 2 days to Lhasa, Lanzhou and Xining respectively. National highway G109 also passes downtown Anduo county.

References

 
Counties of Tibet
Nagqu
Amdo